The National Grants Management Association (NGMA), formerly the National Assistance Management Association, is a professional association, based in the United States, dedicated to the profession of grants management.  Founded in 1978, NGMA now has over 3,300 members.

Certification program
NGMA offers the following professional certification in grants management:
Certified Grants Management Specialist (CGMS) based on demonstrating certain education and experience requirements and successfully passing a comprehensive exam on a broad  body of knowledge (BOK) for grants management.

See also
Federal grants in the United States
Contract
Contract management
Government procurement in the United States
United States contract law
National Contract Management Association (NCMA)

External links
 

Grants (money)
Government procurement in the United States
Business and finance professional associations
Professional associations based in the United States
Professional titles and certifications
Organizations established in 1978
1978 establishments in the United States